The World Figure Skating Championships is an annual figure skating competition sanctioned by the International Skating Union in which figure skaters compete for the title of World Champion.

The 1951 championships took place on February 23–25 in Milan, Italy. It was the first year after World War II that athletes from Germany and Japan were allowed to participate in international sport competition as this World Figure Skating Championships.

Results

Men

Judges:
 Donald H. Gilchrist 
 Eugen Kirchhofer 
 Mollie Phillips 
 Walter S. Powell 
 Adolf Rosdol 
 W. Schilling 
 Mario Verdi

Ladies
*: better placed due to the majority of the better placings

Judges:
 Pamela Davis 
 Emile Finsterwald 
 Donald H. Gilchrist 
 Oscar Madl 
 O. Maly 
 Harold G. Storke 
 Georges Torchon

Pairs

Judges:
 Bruno Bonfiglio 
 Donald H. Gilchrist 
 Eugen Kirchhofer 
 Hans Meixner 
 Mollie Phillips 
 W. Schilling 
 Harold G. Storke

Ice Dance (unofficial)

References

Sources
 Result list provided by the ISU

World Championships
1951
World Championships,1951
Sports competitions in Milan
1951 Figure Skating World Championships
February 1951 sports events in Europe